"Voice of a Savior" is a single from Mandisa. It is her third single from her album True Beauty and her fifth single total. Mandisa released "Voice of a Savior" on her official MySpace page in April 2008.

Charts

References

2008 singles
Mandisa songs
Songs written by Matthew West
Sparrow Records singles
2007 songs
Songs written by Sam Mizell